John James Onslow (October 13, 1888 – December 22, 1960) was an American player, manager, coach and scout in Major League Baseball. A catcher during his playing days, he spent a dozen years in the minor leagues, but only 36 games played in the majors.

Baseball career
At age 60, Onslow became one of the oldest rookie managers in MLB annals when he was named skipper of the Chicago White Sox in the fall of 1948, succeeding Hall of Fame pitcher Ted Lyons. Onslow managed the South Siders for the entire  season, finishing sixth in the American League with a 63–91 record. Compounding matters, he could not get along with his boss, Chisox general manager Frank Lane, and clashed with players and the Chicago press. He avoided being fired by Lane when vice president Chuck Comiskey, son of the White Sox' owner, Grace Comiskey, stepped in on Onslow's behalf at the close of 1949. His career record as a manager: 71 wins, 113 defeats (.386).

In Onslow's 36 games as a major league catcher for the 1912 Detroit Tigers and 1917 New York Giants, he batted only .169 with 13 total hits. But he would become a popular baseball figure as a longtime coach for a number of teams, including the Pittsburgh Pirates (1925–26), Washington Senators (1927), St. Louis Cardinals (1928), Philadelphia Phillies (1931–32) and Boston Red Sox (1934). To people around the game, Onslow was known as one of the most garrulous raconteurs of his day.

Onslow also managed minor league clubs for six seasons. His Memphis Chicks won 92 games in 1948, finishing second in the Southern Association, prompting his promotion to manager of the parent White Sox. Onslow's younger brother, Eddie, also played Major League Baseball and managed in the minor leagues.

Managerial record

See also
 List of St. Louis Cardinals coaches

References

External links
 Baseball Reference
Baseball Almanac
The Deadball Era

 

1888 births
1960 deaths
Baseball players from Pennsylvania
Boston Braves scouts
Boston Red Sox coaches
Boston Red Sox scouts
Buffalo Bisons (minor league) players
Chattanooga Lookouts managers
Chicago White Sox managers
Chicago White Sox scouts
Dallas Giants players
Detroit Tigers players
Fort Wayne Brakies players
Kansas City Blues (baseball) players
Major League Baseball catchers
New York Giants (NL) players
People from Westmoreland County, Pennsylvania
Philadelphia Phillies coaches
Pittsburgh Pirates coaches
Portland Beavers players
Providence Grays (minor league) players
Richmond Colts players
St. Louis Cardinals coaches
Washington Senators (1901–1960) coaches